Wish 107.5 Music Awards 2021 is the 6th edition of the Wish 107.5 Music Awards, an accolade presented by the FM radio station Wish 107.5 to acknowledge the biggest hit makers of the year in the Philippine music industry. The awards were held at the Smart Araneta Coliseum and livestreamed simultaneously at the official YouTube channel of Wish 107.5. The event was hosted by Gretchen Ho and singer Christian Bautista.

However, due to the COVID-19 pandemic in the Philippines, the event was held with safety protocols implemented for the performers, hosts and organizers with a digital livestream on their official YouTube channel.

Impact of the COVID-19 pandemic on the event
Because of the continuing impacts of the COVID-19 pandemic in the Philippines, the event was held without a live audience, Instead, the event was live streamed for free on Wish 107.5's YouTube channel for their audience to watch.

In order to ensure the health and safety of the performers, nominees, organizers and record label representatives who were invited to the event, they had to undergo swab testing and follow health and safety protocols such as social distancing guidelines along with following proper sanitation procedures.

Winners and nominees
Winners are listed first and highlighted in boldface. Tagalog song titles are provided with English translations, enclosed inside the parenthesis.

Special Recognition

Special Awards

Wishclusive Elite Circle Awardees

Multiple awards

Artists with multiple wins
The following artists received three or more awards:

References

External links
 Wish 107.5 Official Site

Members Church of God International
Wish 107.5 Music Awards
Wish
Philippine music awards